Eric David Ludwick (born December 14, 1971) is an American former Major League Baseball (MLB) pitcher who played for the Oakland Athletics, St. Louis Cardinals, Florida Marlins, and Toronto Blue Jays between 1996 and 1999. In the middle of the 1997 season, Ludwick was part of a trade with between the cash-strapped Oakland Athletics and the St. Louis Cardinals that sent Mark McGwire to the Cardinals in exchange for Ludwick, T.J. Matthews, and Blake Stein.

Biography
Ludwick attended the University of Nevada-Las Vegas, and in 1992 he played collegiate summer baseball with the Harwich Mariners of the Cape Cod Baseball League. He was selected by the New York Mets in the second round of the 1993 MLB Draft.

Ludwick is the brother of retired major league outfielder Ryan Ludwick.

References

External links

1971 births
Living people
American expatriate baseball players in Canada
American expatriate baseball players in Japan
Atlantic City Surf players
Baseball players from Missouri
Edmonton Trappers players
Florida Marlins players
Harwich Mariners players
Hiroshima Toyo Carp players
Major League Baseball pitchers
Nippon Professional Baseball pitchers
Oakland Athletics players
St. Louis Cardinals players
Toronto Blue Jays players
UNLV Rebels baseball players
American expatriate baseball players in Australia
Binghamton Mets players
Calgary Cannons players
Charlotte Knights players
Indianapolis Indians players
Louisville Redbirds players
Norfolk Tides players
Pittsfield Mets players
St. Lucie Mets players
Anchorage Glacier Pilots players